The 2011 Spanish Athletics Championships was the 91st edition of the national championship in outdoor track and field for Spain. It was held on 6 and 7 August at the Estadio Ciudad de Málaga in Málaga, Andalusia. It served as the selection meeting for the 2011 World Championships in Athletics. A total of 636 athletes (339 men and 297 women) competed at the event.

The club championships in relays and combined track and field events were contested separately from the main competition.

Results

Men

Women

See also
2011 Spanish Indoor Athletics Championships

References

Results
XCI Campeonato de España Absoluto . Royal Spanish Athletics Federation. Retrieved 2019-07-06.

External links 
 Official website of the Royal Spanish Athletics Federation 

2011
Spanish Athletics Championships
Spanish Championships
Athletics Championships
Sport in Málaga